The 1999–2000 Utah State Aggies men's basketball team represented Utah State University in the 1999–2000 college basketball season. This was head coach Stew Morrill's 2nd season at Utah State. The Aggies played their home games at the Dee Glen Smith Spectrum and were members of the Big West Conference. They finished the season 28–6, 16–0 to capture the regular season championship. They also won the Big West tournament to earn an automatic bid to the 2000 NCAA Division I men's basketball tournament as No. 12 seed in the South Region. Entering play on a 19-game winning streak, the Aggies lost to No. 5 seed and AP #20 Connecticut in the first round.

Roster 

Source

Schedule and results

|-
!colspan=9 style=| Non-conference regular season

|-
!colspan=9 style=| Big West Regular Season

|-
!colspan=9 style=| Big West tournament

|-
!colspan=10 style=| NCAA tournament

Source

References

Utah State
Utah State Aggies men's basketball seasons
Utah State
Aggies
Aggies